At Risk may refer to:
 At Risk (1994 film), an American romantic drama film
 At Risk (2010 film), an American TV movie
 At Risk (book), a 1988 book by Alice Hoffman